

Fact 
 InVID Project (invid-project.eu), funded by European Union, develops tools to verify video content spread via social media, see Applications of artificial intelligence#Deep-fakes

Fiction 
The Invid (sometimes Invids) is either of two distinct fictional, villainous groups:

 Invid (Robotech), an alien species from the Robotech TV series universe
 The Invids, a group of pirates from the Star Wars expanded universe.

Invid can also mean:

 Invid War, a comic book set in the Robotech Universe
 Invid War: Aftermath, a comic book set in the Robotech Universe
 Robotech RPG Book Five: Invid Invasion, an RPG book set in the Robotech Universe
 The New Generation: The Invid Invasion, an omnibus edition novel set in the Robotech Universe
 Invid Invasion, Robotech #10 novel 
 Before the Invid Storm, Robotech #21 novel